Gainesville is a ghost town located in Hancock County, Mississippi.

Formerly a thriving port on the Pearl River, the town experienced decline due to the emergence of railways in the mid-19th century. The land was acquired by NASA in 1962, later becoming home to the Stennis Space Center.

Early history
The land where Gainesville would be founded was part of the Piney Woods region, known to be used by natives for timber purposes- mainly wooden structures and canoes- carved by primitive tools from an abundance of longleaf pines. It was these same tall standing and sturdy trees that drew the attention of early European explorers to the area as a source for ship masts.

The earliest recorded European settlement of the areas was circa 1790, as a port for cotton (later timber) shipments headed downstream to New Orleans. This first settlement was known as Cottonport." Documents indicate that, in later years, the settlement was also known as "English Bluff."

Town of Gainesville
In 1810, an official Spanish land grant of approximately 500 acres was acquired by Dr. Ambrose Gaines, who subsequently named the settlement "Gainesville."

In 1813, Andrew Jackson's forces marched through Gainesville   just prior to the Battle of New Orleans.  The Pearl River Lumber company was founded in Gainesville in 1832, becoming the largest lumber company in the South at the time, and helping to establish Gainesville as one of the most prosperous pre-Civil War settlements in Mississippi.

The town of Gainesville was officially incorporated in 1843, and served as the seat of Hancock County for nearly a decade, until the courthouse burned.

A post office operated under the name Gainesville from 1844 to 1918.

In 1900, Gainesville had a population of 227 and was home to two churches and several stores.

The Gainesville Volunteers were organized in 1860 and made up Company G of the 3rd Mississippi Infantry of the Confederate States Army, serving at Vicksburg and Atlanta.

Decline
Gainesville began to experience decline in the latter half of the 19th Century, due largely to the emergence of railroads as a means for timber transportation. When a major rail-line bypassed the town by ten miles, residents began to leave the area in search of better jobs.

NASA
In 1961, NASA first began considering the area for a research and development center, which would later become the Stennis Space Center.  Several of Gainesville's abandoned buildings were utilized by NASA in the early days of its ownership.

Legacy
The rise and fall of Gainesville is remembered as one of the more dramatic examples of post-Civil War/Industrial Revolution effects in Mississippi. The story of Gainesville's decline is one shared by many communities and towns at the time, which experienced sudden population shifts due to a growing railroad industry bypassing the once thriving settlements.

At its peak, Gainesville boasted a courthouse and numerous homes and other structures of historical significance. According to NASA's Cultural Resources Center, other elements of the town were described as:

"...a hotel called the Gainesville Exchange, a track for horse racing, one or more coffee houses, two barrooms, two drug stores, a Masonic Lodge, shops, stables, brick factories, a telegraph office, dry dock facilities, a steamboat landing, stores for distilling turpentine and other resinous products, and, of course, saw mills."

As late as 1962, many of the original buildings remained, and were utilized by NASA for various purposes, including the Rouchon House- an old fishing lodge- where the first flag-raising ceremony took place. However, today, almost none of the town's original structures remain (with some exceptions; see below section). A pictorial history of old photographs is maintained on NASA's website.

People and places
The followings is a list of documented residents and/or structures once located in Gainesville, as recorded by NASA Cultural Resources:
Acker family; homeowners, multiple properties (c. 1962)
Baptist Church (colored); Congregated by African American residents.
Baptist Church (white); Congregated by white residents; later converted by NASA into an engineering lab. 
Bordage; landowner
Burke; homeowner (c. 1963)
Butler House
Carver House; built in 1865; later owned by J.H. Peterman 
Davis; homeowner (c. 1959)
Grice Home
Henry; homeowner (c. 1962)
Jones Home; home of Malissa Rester Jones (c. 1962). One of the few structures that was not removed when NASA established their test facility. The U.S. Cops of Engineers used the old home as an office for a time, known then as "The Stone House." Currently, the EPA uses the structure as a conference center, now known as "The River House."
Loveless Grocery; Described in the photo caption as "...the only store in Gainesville c. 1963," however other sources indirectly contradict this assertion by mentioning the names of other stores existing around the same time period. 
McQueen; homeowner (c. 1900)
Miller House; Used by NASA in the early days of its ownership; known as "The Yellow House." 
Penton House
Poitevant; homeowner
Rouchon House; Site of first flag-raising ceremony following NASA acquisition.

Reinterment
Following NASA's acquisition in 1961-1962, a total of 483 existing graves were reinterred to make way for construction. Of these, 306 were relocated from the Baptist Church (white) Cemetery; 177 from the Colored Cemetery. A total of 224 graves were unmarked.  A record of the names and reinterment is maintained by the Hancock County Historical Society.

Wisteria vine
A 1963 article in the Picayune Item newspaper reported NASA's effort to protect a (at the time) "75-year-old Wistaria (sic) Vine" located near the Rouchon House. Protection efforts included the erection of a fence and plaque marking the significance of the vine, which the article reports "some old timers believe may be the largest in the world" and described as "a foot thick and it has spread all over the ground and an adjacent cedar tree sixty of seventy feet tall."

References

Ghost towns in Mississippi